Tom and Jerry was a guitar duo of the early 1960s in the United States, consisting of Tommy Tomlinson and Jerry Kennedy.

They recorded instrumentals on the Mercury Records label. Their best known single was "Golden Wildwood Flower" in 1961.

They released four albums, with a general rock and roll theme:
Guitar's Greatest Hits
Guitars Play the Sound of Ray Charles
Guitar's Greatest Hits volume 2
Surfin' Hootenanny

References
 Standard Catalog Of American Records 1950-1975 edited by Tim Neely

American instrumental musical groups